Afro-Eurasia (also Afroeurasia, Eurafrasia or the Old World) is a landmass comprising the continents of Africa, Asia, and Europe. The terms are compound words of the names of its constituent parts. Its mainland is the largest and most populous contiguous landmass on Earth.

Afro-Eurasia encompasses , 57% of the world's land area, and has a population of approximately 6.7 billion people, roughly 86% of the world population.

Related terms 
The following terms are used for similar concepts:

 Ecumene: a term from classical antiquity for the world as was known to ancient Greek scholars, which was limited to Europe and parts of Asia and Africa.
 Old World: a term from the Age of Discovery which, for European explorers, contrasted their previously known world from the New World of the Americas.
 World Island: a term coined by H.J. Mackinder in his "The Geographical Pivot of History" (1904) and used in geopolitical contexts. Mackinder defines the World Island as the large contiguous landmass, technically excluding islands such as Great Britain. "Afro-Eurasia" generally includes those islands usually considered part of Africa, Europe and Asia.

Geology 

Although Afro-Eurasia is typically considered to comprise two or three separate continents, it is not a proper supercontinent. Instead, it is the largest present part of the supercontinent cycle.

Past 
The oldest part of Afro-Eurasia is probably the Kaapvaal Craton, which together with Madagascar and parts of India and western Australia formed part of the first supercontinent Vaalbara or Ur around 3 billion years ago. It has made up parts of every supercontinent since. At the breakup of Pangaea around 200 million years ago, the North American and Eurasian Plates together formed Laurasia while the African Plate remained in Gondwana, from which the Indian Plate split off. Upon impact with the Eurasian Plate, the Indian Plate created southern Asia around 50 million years ago and began the formation of the Himalayas. Around the same time, the Indian Plate also fused with the Australian Plate.

The Arabian Plate broke off of Africa around 30 million years ago and impacted the Iranian Plate between 19 and 12 million years ago during the Miocene, ultimately forming the Alborz and Zagros chains of Iranian Plate. After this initial connection of Afro-Eurasia, the Betic corridor along the Gibraltar Arc closed a little less than 6 million years ago in the Messinian, fusing northwest Africa and Iberia together. This led to the nearly complete desiccation of the Mediterranean Basin, the Messinian salinity crisis. Eurasia and Africa were then again separated with the Zanclean Flood around 5.33 million years ago refilled the Mediterranean Sea through the Strait of Gibraltar.

Present 
Today, the Eurasian Plate and African Plate dominate their respective continents. However, the Somali Plate covers much of eastern Africa, creating the East African Rift. In the eastern Mediterranean, the Aegean Sea Plate, Anatolian Plate and Arabian Plate also form a boundary with the African Plate, which incorporates the Sinai Peninsula, Gulf of Aqaba and the coastal Levant via the Dead Sea Transform. Eurasia also includes the Indian Plate, Burma Plate, Sunda Plate, Yangtze Plate, Amur Plate and Okhotsk Plate, with the North American Plate incorporating the Chukotka Autonomous Okrug in the Russian Far East.

Conventionally, Africa is joined to Eurasia only by a relatively narrow land bridge (which has been split by the Suez Canal at the Isthmus of Suez) and remains separated from Europe by the straits of Gibraltar and Sicily.

Future 
Paleogeologist Ronald Blakey has described the next 15 to 100 million years of tectonic development as fairly settled and predictable. In that time, Africa is expected to continue drifting northward. It will close the Strait of Gibraltar, quickly evaporating the Mediterranean Sea. No supercontinent will form within the settled time frame, however, and the geologic record is full of unexpected shifts in tectonic activity that make further projections "very, very speculative". Three possibilities are known as Novopangaea, Amasia, and Pangaea Proxima. In the first two, the Pacific closes and Africa remains fused to Eurasia, but Eurasia itself splits as Africa and Europe spin towards the west; in the last, the trio spin eastward together as the Atlantic closes, creating land borders with the Americas.

Extreme points 
This is a list of the points that are farther north, south, east or west than any other location on Afro-Eurasia.

Including islands 
 Easternmost Point — Big Diomede†, Russia
 Northernmost Point — Cape Fligeli, Rudolf Island, Franz Josef Land, Russia
 Southernmost Point — Cape Agulhas, South Africa
 Westernmost Point — Santo Antão, Cape Verde

Mainland 
 Easternmost Point — Cape Dezhnev†, Russia
 Northernmost Point — Cape Chelyuskin, Russia
 Southernmost Point — Cape Agulhas, South Africa
 Westernmost Point — Pointe des Almadies, Senegal

† The 180th meridian passes through Asia, meaning that these points are in the Western Hemisphere.

See also 

 Extreme points of Earth
 Extreme points of Africa
 Extreme points of Eurasia
 Extreme points of Asia
 Extreme points of Europe
 Geography of Africa
 Geography of Asia
 Geography of Europe
 Intermediate Region
 The Geographical Pivot of History

References

External links 
 Interactive scholarly edition, with critical English translation and multimodal resources mashup (publications, images, videos) Engineering Historical Memory.

 
Supercontinents
Geography of Africa
Geography of Asia
Geography of Europe
Extreme points of Earth
Extreme points of Asia